Calderwood is a neighbourhood of the Scottish new town of East Kilbride, in South Lanarkshire. It lies on its north-east edge and is one of the largest areas of the town.

Location
Calderwood is the second oldest planned neighbourhood in East Kilbride, built about 1950, shortly after The Murray. Most initial residents moved in from condemned housing in Glasgow. It is the town's largest residential area, forming most of the East Kilbride East multi-member electoral ward, which had a recorded overall population of 14,308 in 2019; the remainder of the neighbourhood (west of Calderwood Road, east of the Kingsway dual carriageway bypass, including Maxwellton) is in the East Kilbride Central North ward. The one directly neighbouring area is St Leonards to the south. Calderwood is divided from the East Mains and Village areas to the west by the bypass – there are no direct road-traffic links, only two underpasses beneath the road and a footbridge over it.

History
The area includes Hunter House Museum at Long Calderwood Farmhouse, once the home of the 18th-century medical and zoological pioneers William and John, who were famous anatomists. In 2011 the museum building was bought by the neighbouring Calderwood Baptist Church and converted into the "Hunter House Cafe", a space for the community and church use. The building and estate had belonged to the Hunter family since the 17th century, when it relocated from nearer to East Kilbride Kirkton Park. The extant buildings date from the late 17th to 19th centuries, with a 20th-century extension from the building's time as a museum.

The area includes Calderwood Glen, the northern section of Calderglen Country Park. This was widely praised as a picturesque and romantic attraction in the 18th and 19th centuries, and by the early 1900s recognised as a renowned beauty spot in the West of Scotland. Calderwood Castle, demolished by the Royal Engineers in 1951 after more than a decade of decline, was home for nearly five centuries to the Maxwells of Calderwood, including Sir James, second husband of Lady Margaret Cunningham, the memoirist and correspondent. The Calderwood area was sketched by the 18th-century artist Paul Sandby, and visited several times by British and foreign aristocracy, including Princess Mary Adelaide and the Crown Prince of Denmark. A second view by Paul Sandby shows Calderwood Linn, a waterfall currently known colloquially as Castle Falls, discovered in April 2015. Alongside a sister sketch, the wash drawing represents the earliest known view of Calderwood and of East Kilbride. 

Much of Calderwood Glen forms a Site of Special Scientific Interest (SSSI) for palaeontology and geology, designated on 1 August 1990.  It is also known for endemic woodland species of flowers, mosses and fungi in pockets of natural and semi-natural ancient woodland, once parts of the primeval woodland of Central Scotland. Calderwood Glen was noted for scarce flora by botanists who surveyed the region, including Hennedy, Hooker, Hopkirk, Lee, Patrick and Ure, and whose findings were all included in an edited regional survey of 2016.

Maxwellton Conservation Area
The 18th–19th-century weaving village of Maxwellton survives as the western part of the Calderwood neighbourhood. Once a rural community, it was the main area of settlement in the Barony lands of the ancient Calderwood Estate, where from 1400 until about 1900, the Maxwells of Calderwood were the main landed family. Maxwellton became prominent locally and nationally from the 1960s onwards, when a dispute broke out between residents and the East Kilbride Development Corporation, which sought to condemn the settlement as a slum and demolish it to make way for part of the East Kilbride new town development. The Burgh Council of East Kilbride sided with the villagers, and with backing from the National Trust For Scotland, the campaign over subsequent years saved most of the village on historic, architectural and aesthetic grounds. Maxwellton village then joined the early statutory conservation areas in Scotland, after nearby Eaglesham in 1968. 

The campaign to save the village reached cabinet level in the House of Commons and gained national publicity, mostly due through Judith Hart MP and Fred S. Mitchell. Mitchell was a memoirist, a topographical historian for Calderwood and a Maxwellton resident, on the reference staff of the Mitchell Library in Glasgow. After the rescue, the village began to receive backing from the Development Corporation originally intent on its destruction. The result was the national press sponsoring the restoration of one derelict cottage – thereafter referred to locally as the Express Cottage, as the Scottish Daily Express issued regular national coverage of its attempts to restore the house to fashionable conservation standards. The interest in the village then led over a thousand buyers to bid for the 23 run-down Maxwellton cottages. The efforts to restore the village and the Development Corporation's publicity led to an unveiling of the show cottage by the Marchioness of Bute, which received national press coverage. 

Along with a townscape of weaving cottages, Maxwellton preserves the original Calderwood Estate's endowment school, founded by Sir William Alexander Maxwell, 8th Baronet of Calderwood, in 1839. This was seen as advanced for its time in providing funds, materials and facilities for a superior educational experience and extensive provisions for educating the poor. The school received an annual endowment from the Barony of Calderwood to support pupils and teacher salaries. The advances by Sir William sufficed for Maxwellton School to be cited and studied several times as an issue in the history of education in Scotland. It is now a private dwelling named Alma, classed as a Category B listed building.

Facilities 
The Calderwood area has the John Wright Sports Centre, named after a prominent 1960s new-town provost and offering a full-length athletics track opened in 1972. Calderwood Square is the main neighbourhood centre for retail and food outlets, Nearby amenities include Calderwood Community Hall, the Alison Lea Medical Centre, and the Moncreiff Church of Scotland parish church, named after a prominent disruption minister connected with East Kilbride and Calderwood, Sir Henry Wellwood-Moncreiff, 10th Baronet. Calderwood had a local library that has since been converted into a place of worship: the East Kilbride Islamic Centre.

Housing
The original housing in the area (each with plumbing and electricity and separate bathrooms and kitchens – a noted improvement for residents used to overcrowded, crumbling inner-city city slums) followed a similar pattern to other parts of the town: individual dwellings were mainly in short terraced rows facing onto streets, or less commonly with an access road and parking area skirting the houses, accessed by footpaths and sometimes with a communal green space. Flats also featured, constructed in either a traditional-style common close with individual balconies, usually three storeys high, or in standalone angular blocks of three or four storeys off a central stairway, providing 9, 12 or 16 apartments. This type grew increasingly commonplace in the 1960s as the neighbourhood was extended and efforts went into meeting ambitious housebuilding targets with less space available than before. Six tower blocks of 15 storeys were built in two clusters in the north of the area, providing a total of 522 residences.

Current schools
Calderwood has five primary schools: Long Calderwood Primary, Maxwellton Primary, Hunter Primary, Greenburn Primary (catering to children with special needs), and St Leonards R.C. Primary. Under South Lanarkshire's Schools Modernisation Programme beginning in the mid 2000s, these were rebuilt and modernised.

Until the summer of 2007, there was a secondary school in the area named Hunter High School. As part of a modernisation programme, this was merged with the nearby Claremont High School in St Leonards to form Calderglen High School, next to the former Claremont High campus. The Hunter High building was demolished. Most of the land where Hunter High and the older Hunter Primary stood has been built over by modern housing, including Gamekeeper's Wynd.

Notable people

Joanna Baillie, poet and dramatist
Matthew Baillie, physician
William and Jim Reid, musicians (The Jesus and Mary Chain)
Ally McCoist, footballer (Rangers and Scotland)
Julie Wilson Nimmo, actress

References

Areas of East Kilbride